Facility location is a name given to several different problems in computer science and in game theory:
 Facility location problem, the optimal placement of facilities as a function of transportation costs and other factors
 Facility location (competitive game), in which competitors simultaneously select facility locations and prices, in order to maximize profit
 Facility location (cooperative game), with the goal of sharing costs among clients